Football Club Bolsover was a football club based in Bolsover, Derbyshire, England. They played at Shirebrook Town's Langwith Road ground.

History
The club was originally established in 2013, but were denied entry to the Central Midlands League for the 2013–14 season as they were unable to meet the ground grading criteria. In 2016 the club was re-established and joined the North Division of the Central Midlands League. They went on to win the division at the first attempt, earning promotion to Division One of the Northern Counties East League. At the end of the 2018–19 season the club were transferred to the East Midlands Counties League but resigned from the league and withdrew from the FA Vase.

Grounds
The club initially played at Shirebrook Academy before relocating to Shirebrook Town's Langwith Road ground.

Honours
Central Midlands League
North Division champions 2016–17

References

External links
 Official website

Association football clubs established in 2016
Defunct football clubs in Derbyshire
2016 establishments in England
Central Midlands Football League
Northern Counties East Football League
Association football clubs disestablished in 2019
2019 disestablishments in England
Defunct football clubs in England